Vindry-sur-Turdine is a commune in the Rhône department in eastern France. It was established on 1 January 2019 by merger of the former communes of Pontcharra-sur-Turdine (the seat), Dareizé, Les Olmes and Saint-Loup.

Population
The population data given in the table below refer to the commune in its geography as of January 2020.

See also
Communes of the Rhône department

References

Communes of Rhône (department)